Robert Adger Law (1879–1961) was an American Shakespeare scholar and full professor at University of Texas, and also formerly the editor of Texas Review (now Southwest Review) at Southern Methodist University from 1915 to 1924. The Robert Adger Law and Thos H. Law Professorship at University of Texas was named in his honor and the current holder is Lester L. Faigley.

Law graduated in 1898 with a B.A. from Wofford College, in 1902 with an M.A. from Trinity College (later Duke University), and in 1905 with a Ph.D. from Harvard.

References

1879 births
1961 deaths
American literary historians
University of Texas faculty
Wofford College alumni
Duke University alumni
Harvard University alumni